Premcor (formerly NYSE symbol PCO) was a Fortune 500 oil refinery group based in Greenwich, Connecticut.

Premcor was acquired by Valero in 2005.  Valero would later sell the Lima facility to Husky Energy in July 2007 and close the Delaware City refinery in November 2009.

External links 
Valero website

Companies based in Greenwich, Connecticut
Private equity portfolio companies
Companies disestablished in 2005